Adams Township is a township in Nemaha County, Kansas, United States.

References

Townships in Nemaha County, Kansas
Townships in Kansas